Christer Lindarw (born 3 March 1953) is a Swedish clothes designer, actor, drag queen entertainer, and the leader of drag group After Dark.

Career

Lindarw was born in Eskilstuna, Södermanland County. He was educated at Beckmans designhögskola in Stockholm. His 1976 stage debut was as Zsa Zsa Shakespeer in Wild Side Story at Alexandra Charles's club, and he staged his first major production at Hamburger Börs in 1980 together with Roger Jönsson and Lars Flinckman, Lindarw's future co-star of many years from stage shows with their group After Dark. After Dark participated in  Melodifestivalen with the song La dolce vita and placed third in the final in Globen.

Lindarws interest for dragshowing started after an masquerade where the theme was reversed gender roles. On Jönsson's recommendation he had started to appear in drag in 1976.

Lindarw hosted shows at the nightclub Shazam for a few months and then started the dragshow group After Dark and opened his own nightclub with the same name at David Bagares gata in Stockholm. The group had its big breakthrough called Förför Sverige i tiden at Hamburger Börs.

Christer Lindarw also started designing dresses for his friend Lill Lindfors, one being the dress that accidentally "fell off" her during her introduction at the Eurovision Song Contest 1985.

In 2017,  Lindarw performed the surprise finale number, imitating Queen Silvia of Sweden, during the annual televised show in Öland for Crown Princess Victoria's 40th birthday. In the fall of 2016 Bonniers had published a lauded book about his life. Simultaneously, Lindarw began another media-praised show tour around Sweden, with him alone leading his cast; all sold out, it wrapped up a year later at Oscarsteatern in Stockholm, also ending the four decades of successful performances of After Dark.

Outside Sweden Christer Lindarw is known mainly for performances in California and Spain and for clothes he has designed for international celebrities such as Diana Ross.

Family
His father was the international speedway rider Bert Lindarw.

Bibliography

References

External links 

Lindarw.net 
After Dark - La dolce vita
www.afterdark.nu - After Dark's history

1953 births
Living people
Sommar (radio program) hosts
Swedish drag queens
Swedish entertainers
21st-century LGBT people
Melodifestivalen contestants of 2016
Melodifestivalen contestants of 2007
Melodifestivalen contestants of 2006
Melodifestivalen contestants of 2004